Rapée is a given name and surname. Notable people with this given name or surname include:

 Rapee Sagarik (1922–2018), Thai agronomist
 Ernö Rapée (1891–1945), American symphonic conductor
 George Rapée (1915–1999), American bridge player